Owen Wynne (1755 – 12 December 1841) was an Irish landowner and politician.

He was the son of Owen Wynne (1723–1789) of Hazelwood, an MP of the Parliament of Ireland, and his wife the Hon. Anne Maxwell. He succeeded to his father's estates in 1789, inheriting Hazelwood House, Sligo.

He was elected a Member of the Irish Parliament for Sligo Borough for 1776–1790 and 1791–1800. After the act of Union he sat as MP for Sligo in the UK Parliament in 1801–1806, resigning his seat by taking the notional crown office of profit as Escheator of Munster. He returned many years later as MP for Sligo borough in 1820–1830. He was appointed custos rotulorum for County Sligo for life in 1789 and High Sheriff of Sligo for 1819–20 and High Sheriff of Leitrim for 1833–34.

He died in 1841. He had married Lady Sarah Elizabeth Cole, the daughter of William Cole, 1st Earl of Enniskillen; they had two sons and four daughters. His son John Arthur Wynne (1801–1865) inherited Hazelwood, and served as MP for Sligo Borough, and his daughter Sarah married Edward Joshua Cooper of Markree Castle.

References

External links 
 

1755 births
1841 deaths
Irish MPs 1776–1783
Irish MPs 1783–1790
Irish MPs 1790–1797
Irish MPs 1798–1800
Members of the Parliament of Ireland (pre-1801) for County Sligo constituencies
Members of the Parliament of the United Kingdom for County Sligo constituencies (1801–1922)
UK MPs 1801–1802
UK MPs 1802–1806
UK MPs 1820–1826
UK MPs 1826–1830
High Sheriffs of County Sligo
High Sheriffs of Leitrim
18th-century Irish landowners
19th-century Irish landowners